City Lights is a British comedy-drama broadcast on ITV starring Robson Green and Mark Benton. The show is a sequel to the 2006 series Northern Lights (a spin-off of the Christmas special Christmas Lights), and a prequel to the 2008 TV film Clash of the Santas.

Plot
As in the previous series, Green and Benton play Colin Armstrong and Howie Scott, two best friends since childhood who are married to two sisters, Jackie (played by Nicola Stephenson) and Pauline (played by Siân Reeves). The series commences with the two friends being the only witnesses to a gangland shooting, and after the police fail to catch the culprit, and the families' houses are set alight, the families are forced to go on the witness protection programme, which relocates them to London. They are forced to change their names, with Colin choosing Brad Shearer, a reference to Newcastle United F.C. player Alan Shearer, and Howie choosing the name Duncan Carr, not realising he didn't have to stick to the suggestion list. He requests a change of name but it's too late. He decides to get people to call him by his middle name which is Wayne but then realises that it now sounds like the curse word 'wanker'.

It is also revealed that Pauline is having an affair with a workmate, although Howie is unaware of this. This develops later in the series as, separated from her lover, she develops an attraction to the police officer who first dealt with their case, DS Tate, failing to realise that he is being blackmailed by the criminal who is after the two families, Sweeney, who has bought up his gambling debts.

As the problems between the two families worsen, Colin and Howie make numerous accidental references to others that reveal their true names and origins. Both of their relationships with their wives also become strenuous, after it is revealed that Colin was married prior to marrying Jackie, yet never revealed the fact to her. Howie is also in trouble as he was best man at the wedding and failed to disclose the fact to Jackie or Pauline.

While Jackie forgives Colin, Howie and Pauline's relationship seems to be over after she disappears without trace, spending the day with DS Tate, unaware that he is revealing her location to Sweeney. However, DS Tate changes his mind and decides not to take her to an agreed meeting place with Sweeney. Pauline phones Howie to tell him that their relationship is over, unaware that her call is being listened to by the police, who believe that she has been kidnapped.

Pauline then spends the night with Tate, giving him the opportunity to read her address from a piece of paper in her handbag. Meanwhile, Howie and Colin become traffic wardens, and Colin accidentally gives his influence David Ginola a parking ticket. Partially as a result of this, they resign their positions as traffic wardens and Colin buys a large quantity of gardening equipment, proposing that they set up a landscape gardening business.

After discovering that Pauline is having an affair, Howie trails her to a hotel where she is with DS Tate, however, they are caught and kidnapped by Sweeney's thugs. They are taken before Sweeney, who demands they return the drugs they 'stole' from him. Howie and Colin lead Sweeney's thugs on a false trail to find the drugs.

The Police find out that the person Pauline has been contacting is DS Tate, and immediately interrogate her about it. Meanwhile, Sweeney's thugs take Howie and Colin back to Sweeney's caravan, where DS Tate is waiting for them, ready to shoot them both. DS Tate, Howie and Colin escape after fooling Sweeney's thugs into thinking Tate actually shot them (He poured tomato ketchup over them to make it look like blood). One of the thugs kills the other, and claims that he will make it look like the thug and Tate shot each other - "After all, you were shagging the big guy's wife." Howie and Colin hear this, overpower the thug and take his gun, before throwing him into the back of a nearby car. They drive to the airfield where Sweeney is about to leave in a plane, and mistakenly stop the wrong plane, however, the police arrive and stop the plane carrying Sweeney. Tate is arrested for conspiring to kidnap, and Colin and Howie return to the safe house. However, Colin collapses and it transpires that after Sweeney's thug kicked him earlier, he had a ruptured spleen. Colin thinks he's been given the 'snip', however, it is explained that he had a splenectomy and is not able to have the 'snip'. Jackie reveals that she is pregnant and Colin and Howie decide to stay in London.

Episodes

References

External links

 City Lights at The Robson Green Web Site

2000s British comedy-drama television series
2007 British television series debuts
2007 British television series endings
British comedy-drama television shows
ITV television dramas
ITV comedy
Television shows set in London
Television shows set in Manchester
Television series by ITV Studios
English-language television shows